Sir Peter William Horby is a British physician, epidemiologist, Moh Family Foundation Professor of Emerging Infections and Global Health, and Director of the Pandemic Sciences Institute at the University of Oxford. He is the founder, and former director of the Oxford University Clinical Research Unit in Hanoi, Vietnam which was founded in 2006. In 2014, Horby established the Epidemic Research Group Oxford (ERGO). ERGO incorporates a number of international projects such as the European Commission funded PREPARE, the African coaLition for Epidemic Research, Response and Training (ALERRT),  and the International Severe Acute Respiratory and emerging Infection Consortium (ISARIC). Since 2016, Horby has been chair and executive director of ISARIC.

Horby specialises in emerging  and epidemic infectious diseases. He is the co-chief investigator of the RECOVERY Trial into drugs for COVID-19 (the largest clinical trial of COVID-19 in the world) alongside Martin Landray. In June 2020, he gave a statement at 10 Downing Street alongside the Prime Minister and Chief Scientific Adviser announcing the first positive trial results of the first life-saving COVID-19 drug, Dexamethasone. He is the primary author on the published preliminary report.

Horby is one of the 23 attendees of the Scientific Advisory Group for Emergencies (SAGE)  He is the chair of the New and Emerging Respiratory Virus Threats Advisory Group (NERVTAG).

He was knighted in the 2021 Birthday Honours for services to medical research.

References

External links 

 

Academics of the University of Oxford
British epidemiologists
Living people
Year of birth missing (living people)
Knights Bachelor